The Church of the Good Shepherd, on Oak Street in Thomasville, Georgia, dates from 1908.  It was listed on the National Register of Historic Places in 1987.

The listing included three contributing buildings: the church (1894) and a parish hall that form a U-shaped complex, plus a vicarage (1908).  The parish hall was built in 1896 and modified in 1907-1912 and in 1923.

References

Churches on the National Register of Historic Places in Georgia (U.S. state)
Victorian architecture in Georgia (U.S. state)
Churches completed in 1908
National Register of Historic Places in Thomas County, Georgia